The 1963 Missouri Tigers baseball team represented University of Missouri in the 1963 NCAA University Division baseball season. The Tigers played their home games at Simmons Field. The team was coached by Hi Simmons in his 23rd year as head coach at Missouri.

The Tigers won the District V Playoff to advance to the College World Series, where they were defeated by the Southern California Trojans.

Roster

Schedule

|-
! style="" | Regular Season
|-

|-
! bgcolor="#DDDDFF" width="3%" | #
! bgcolor="#DDDDFF" width="7%" | Date
! bgcolor="#DDDDFF" width="14%" | Opponent
! bgcolor="#DDDDFF" width="25%" | Site/Stadium
! bgcolor="#DDDDFF" width="5%" | Score
! bgcolor="#DDDDFF" width="5%" | Overall Record
! bgcolor="#DDDDFF" width="5%" | Big 8 Record
|- align="center" bgcolor="#ccffcc"
| 1 || March 30 || at  || Washington County Fairgrounds • Fayetteville, Arkansas || 16–6 || 1–0 || 0–0
|- align="center" bgcolor="#ffcccc"
| 2 || March 30 || at Arkansas|| Washington County Fairgrounds • Fayetteville, Arkansas || 5–6 || 1–1 || 0–0
|-

|-
! bgcolor="#DDDDFF" width="3%" | #
! bgcolor="#DDDDFF" width="7%" | Date
! bgcolor="#DDDDFF" width="14%" | Opponent
! bgcolor="#DDDDFF" width="25%" | Site/Stadium
! bgcolor="#DDDDFF" width="5%" | Score
! bgcolor="#DDDDFF" width="5%" | Overall Record
! bgcolor="#DDDDFF" width="5%" | Big 8 Record
|- align="center" bgcolor="#ccffcc"
| 3 || April 1 || at  || Unknown • Shreveport, Louisiana || 7–2 || 2–1 || 0–0
|- align="center" bgcolor="#ccffcc"
| 4 || April 2 || at Centenary || Unknown • Shreveport, Louisiana || 11–6 || 3–1 || 0–0
|- align="center" bgcolor="#ffcccc"
| 5 || April 3 || at  || Unknown • Tulsa, Oklahoma || 4–5 || 3–2 || 0–0
|- align="center" bgcolor="#ccffcc"
| 6 || April 3 || at Tulsa || Unknown • Tulsa, Oklahoma || 4–1 || 4–2 || 0–0
|- align="center" bgcolor="#ffcccc"
| 7 || April 5 || at  || Unknown • Stillwater, Oklahoma || 0–1 || 4–3 || 0–1
|- align="center" bgcolor="#ccffcc"
| 8 || April 5 || at Oklahoma State || Unknown • Stillwater, Oklahoma || 2–0 || 5–3 || 1–1
|- align="center" bgcolor="#ccffcc"
| 9 || April 12 || at || Cap Timm Field • Ames, Iowa || 2–0 || 6–3 || 2–1
|- align="center" bgcolor="#ccffcc"
| 10 || April 12 || at Iowa State || Cap Timm Field • Ames, Iowa || 9–1 || 7–3 || 3–1
|- align="center" bgcolor="#ccffcc"
| 11 || April 13 || at Iowa State || Cap Timm Field • Ames, Iowa || 3–0 || 8–3 || 4–1
|- align="center" bgcolor="#ccffcc"
| 12 || April 19 ||  || Simmons Field • Columbia, Missouri || 21–7 || 9–3 || 5–1
|- align="center" bgcolor="#ccffcc"
| 13 || April 20 || Colorado || Simmons Field • Columbia, Missouri || 7–1 || 10–3 || 6–1
|- align="center" bgcolor="#ccffcc"
| 14 || April 20 || Colorado || Simmons Field • Columbia, Missouri || 9–0 || 11–3 || 7–1
|- align="center" bgcolor="#ccffcc"
| 15 || April 26 ||  || Simmons Field • Columbia, Missouri || 4–1 || 12–3 || 8–1
|- align="center" bgcolor="#ccffcc"
| 16 || April 26 || Kansas State || Simmons Field • Columbia, Missouri || 8–1 || 13–3 || 9–1

|-
! bgcolor="#DDDDFF" width="3%" | #
! bgcolor="#DDDDFF" width="7%" | Date
! bgcolor="#DDDDFF" width="14%" | Opponent
! bgcolor="#DDDDFF" width="25%" | Site/Stadium
! bgcolor="#DDDDFF" width="5%" | Score
! bgcolor="#DDDDFF" width="5%" | Overall Record
! bgcolor="#DDDDFF" width="5%" | Big 8 Record
|- align="center" bgcolor="#ffcccc"
| 17 || May 3 ||  || Simmons Field • Columbia, Missouri || 2–3 || 13–4 || 9–2
|- align="center" bgcolor="#ccffcc"
| 18 || May 3 || Oklahoma || Simmons Field • Columbia, Missouri || 9–6 || 14–4 || 10–2
|- align="center" bgcolor="#ccffcc"
| 19 || May 4 || Oklahoma || Simmons Field • Columbia, Missouri || 5–1 || 15–4 || 11–2
|- align="center" bgcolor="#ccffcc"
| 20 || May 10 || at  || Husker Diamond • Lincoln, Nebraska || 6–0 || 16–4 || 11–2
|- align="center" bgcolor="#ccffcc"
| 21 || May 10 || at Nebraska || Husker Diamond • Lincoln, Nebraska || 8–0 || 17–4 || 12–2
|- align="center" bgcolor="#ccffcc"
| 22 || May 11 || at Nebraska || Husker Diamond • Lincoln, Nebraska || 7–0 || 18–4 || 13–2
|- align="center" bgcolor="#ccffcc"
| 23 || May 17 ||  || Simmons Field • Columbia, Missouri || 2–1 || 19–4 || 14–2
|- align="center" bgcolor="#ffcccc"
| 24 || May 18 || Kansas || Simmons Field • Columbia, Missouri || 2–3 || 19–5 || 14–3
|- align="center" bgcolor="#ccffcc"
| 25 || May 18 || Kansas || Simmons Field • Columbia, Missouri || 4–3 || 20–5 || 15–3

|-

|-
! style="" | Postseason
|-

|-
! bgcolor="#DDDDFF" width="3%" | #
! bgcolor="#DDDDFF" width="7%" | Date
! bgcolor="#DDDDFF" width="14%" | Opponent
! bgcolor="#DDDDFF" width="25%" | Site/Stadium
! bgcolor="#DDDDFF" width="5%" | Score
! bgcolor="#DDDDFF" width="5%" | Overall Record
! bgcolor="#DDDDFF" width="5%" | Big 8 Record
|- align="center" bgcolor="#ccffcc"
| 26 || June 3 || at  || Musial Field • St. Louis, Missouri || 16–0 || 21–5 || 15–3
|- align="center" bgcolor="#ffcccc"
| 27 || June 4 || at Saint Louis || Musial Field • St. Louis, Missouri || 1–2 || 21–6 || 15–3
|- align="center" bgcolor="#ccffcc"
| 28 || June 4 || at Saint Louis || Musial Field • St. Louis, Missouri || 7–1 || 22–6 || 15–3
|-

|-
! bgcolor="#DDDDFF" width="3%" | #
! bgcolor="#DDDDFF" width="7%" | Date
! bgcolor="#DDDDFF" width="14%" | Opponent
! bgcolor="#DDDDFF" width="25%" | Site/Stadium
! bgcolor="#DDDDFF" width="5%" | Score
! bgcolor="#DDDDFF" width="5%" | Overall Record
! bgcolor="#DDDDFF" width="5%" | Big 8 Record
|- align="center" bgcolor="#ccffcc"
| 29 || June 10 || vs Holy Cross || Omaha Municipal Stadium • Omaha, Nebraska || 3–0 || 23–6 || 15–3
|- align="center" bgcolor="#ccffcc"
| 30 || June 11 || vs Texas || Omaha Municipal Stadium • Omaha, Nebraska || 3–2 || 24–6 || 15–3
|- align="center" bgcolor="#ffcccc"
| 31 || June 12 || vs Arizona || Omaha Municipal Stadium • Omaha, Nebraska || 4–6 || 24–7 || 15–3
|- align="center" bgcolor="#ffcccc"
| 32 || June 13 || vs Southern California || Omaha Municipal Stadium • Omaha, Nebraska || 3–12 || 24–8 || 15–3
|-

|-
|

Awards and honors
Dave Harvey
Second Team All-American
All-Big Eight Conference
All District V Team

Gene McArtor
All-Big Eight Conference
All District V Team

Bob Price
All-Big Eight Conference
All District V Team

John Sevcik
Third Team All-American
All-Big Eight Conference
All District V Team

Jack Stroud
All-Big Eight Conference
All District V Team

References

Missouri Tigers baseball seasons
Missouri Tigers baseball
College World Series seasons
Missouri
Big Eight Conference baseball champion seasons